Augai or Augae was a coastal town of ancient Pamphylia or of Cilicia, inhabited during Roman times. It was located 70 stadia from Aunesis.

Its site is tentatively located near Sarapşa, in Asiatic Turkey.

References

Populated places in ancient Cilicia
Populated places in ancient Pamphylia
Former populated places in Turkey
Roman towns and cities in Turkey
History of Antalya Province